The Fortieth Door is a 1924 American adventure film serial directed by George B. Seitz and starring Allene Ray and Bruce Gordon. The film is considered to be lost. The Library of Congress includes the film among the National Film Preservation Board's updated 2019 list of "7,200 Lost U.S. Silent Feature Films" produced between 1912 and 1929.

Plot
As described in a film magazine review, this desert story concerns Jack Ryder, an American archeologist in Egypt, and Aimee, who is believed to be a Mohammedan. Jack falls in love with Aimee at a dance in a Cairo hotel. Her father agrees to betroth her to a swindling nobleman to keep from being arrested for trading in narcotics. In the ruins of the Egyptian tombs, Jack finds proof that Aimee is a young French woman whose parents had been captured by bandits and had then fallen into the hands of an Egyptian nobleman. All ends well, however, and everyone lives happily thereafter.

Cast

Reception
While the serial consisted mainly of adventures and escapes in the Egyptian desert, its plot also involved archaeological excavations. A contemporary archaeological journal, noting how producers had recently promoted historical accuracy as a feature of their films, stated that The Fortieth Door attempted to bring an overall ancient Egyptian look to scenes with the exterior of a tomb, but the interior lacked any authenticity in its furnishings or jewelry. The article recommended that films employ an Egyptologist for accuracy.

Chapter titles

See also
 List of film serials
 List of film serials by studio
 List of lost films

References

External links

1924 films
1924 lost films
1924 adventure films
American adventure films
American silent serial films
American black-and-white films
Pathé Exchange film serials
Films directed by George B. Seitz
Lost American films
Films about archaeology
Films based on American novels
Films set in Egypt
1920s American films
Silent adventure films